Michael Dean Lockwood (born May 22, 1961) is an American guitarist and producer. He is known for having been married to Lisa Marie Presley, and for producing and performing with her, Aimee Mann, Fiona Apple, and others.

Biography
Lockwood graduated from Highland High School in Bakersfield, California in 1979. He has worked with Carly Simon, Fiona Apple, Bijou Phillips, Alana Davis, Ben Taylor, Leona Naess, Susanna Hoffs and Michael Penn. In 1985 Lockwood joined the group Lions & Ghosts. They disbanded in 1989 after a second record was released. He later formed a local power pop band, Wink.

Personal life 
Lockwood married Lisa Marie Presley on January 22, 2006. On October 7, 2008, Presley gave birth to twin girls. In June 2016, Presley filed for divorce from Lockwood after ten years of marriage.

In February 2017, the couple's children were taken into protective custody after Lisa Marie Presley stated that she witnessed inappropriate images of children on Lockwood's personal computer in a divorce court filing challenging Lockwood's request for spousal support. Neither Brentwood nor the Tennessee Bureau of Investigations  found any wrongdoing after an exhaustive search of 80 electronic devices, including the devices that Ms. Presley turned over to law enforcement. The divorce was finalized on May 26, 2021.

Lockwood married Stephanie Hobgood on October 10, 2022.

Selected discography
Throughout his career Lockwood has worked with a wide range of artists and bands in various genres both as a musician and collaborator.

References

External links
 

1961 births
Living people
Musicians from Bakersfield, California
Musicians from Hawthorne, California
Presley family